"Tranquility Base Hotel & Casino" is a song by English indie rock band Arctic Monkeys. It was released on 23 July 2018 as the second single from their sixth studio album of the same name, along with an accompanying music video. On 16 October 2018, it was announced that a 7-inch vinyl version of the single would be released on 30 November 2018, alongside the previously unreleased B-side "Anyways".

Music video
The music video was released on 23 July 2018 through the band's official YouTube Vevo account. It was directed by Ben Chappell and Aaron Brown who also directed the previous video for "Four Out of Five", and continues the Stanley Kubrick inspired visuals of the previous clip. The video centres around Turner living in the titular hotel and casino, travelling around the floors and lounging in the leisure facilities. He also plays the role of "Mark", the hotel's resident concierge, answering the telephone and redirecting the calls. The video was shot at the Peppermill Reno in Reno, Nevada. The moped which appears in the video is a Honda Elite 80.

Track listing

Personnel
Credits adapted from liner notes.

"Tranquility Base Hotel & Casino"
Alex Turner – vocals, backing vocals, piano, bass, organ, Orchestron, harpsichord
Jamie Cook – guitar
James Ford – drums, Orchestron, harpsichord, synthesisers, synthesiser programming

"Anyways"
Alex Turner – all instruments

Artwork
 Zackery Michael – photography
 Matthew Cooper – design

Charts

Release history

See also
 Tranquility Base, namesake, the lunar landing site of the 1969 Apollo 11 mission

References

Songs about hotels and motels
2018 songs
2018 singles
Arctic Monkeys songs
Domino Recording Company singles
Songs written by Alex Turner (musician)